I Won't Mention It Again is a studio album by country music artist Ray Price. It was released in 1971 by Columbia Records (catalog no. C-30510).

The album debuted on Billboard magazine's country album chart on June 12, 1971, held the No. 1 spot for five weeks, and remained on the chart for a total of 42 weeks. It also won the Country Music Association Award for Album of the Year. It included two hit singles: "I Won't Mention It Again" (No. 1) and "I'd Rather Be Sorry" (No. 2).

AllMusic gave the album three stars.

Track listing
Side A
 "I Won't Mention It Again"
 "Kiss the World Goodbye"
 "Sunday Morning Comin' Down"
 "The Burden of Freedom"
 "Forgive My Heart"
 "I'd Rather Be Sorry"

Side B
 "Lovin' Her Was Easier (Than Anything I'll Ever Do Again)"
 "Bridge Over Troubled Water"
 "When I Loved Her"
 "Sweet Memories"
 "Jesse Younger"

References

1971 albums
Ray Price (musician) albums
Columbia Records albums